Scorpia is the pseudonym of a video game journalist who was active from the early 1980s through the late 1990s.  She wrote for Computer Gaming World, performing reviews on role-playing video games and adventure games.  Scorpia was known for harsh criticism of video games she disliked.  She was fired after CGW was sold to Ziff-Davis in 1999 and subsequently retired from games journalism.  Her pseudonym is based on a character she created in a role-playing game.

Career 
Scorpia became interested in computers after attending a computer expo. Her initial intention was to become a programmer, and she said she bought her first computer games to learn how to program. In November 1982, while working as a data processing consultant, Scorpia co-founded an early gaming-related Special Interest Group on CompuServe. It became the eighth most popular forum on CompuServe, and Scorpia received free access to the subscription service in return for maintaining it.  As a system operator, she ran online conferences and hosted games. The following year, Computer Gaming World (CGW) owner Russell Sipe contacted her on CompuServe and invited her to write for the magazine. Scorpia agreed, though she had never read it. She reviewed role-playing video games and adventure games there for 16 years.

Scorpia became a prominent reviewer in the industry. In addition to her writing and online presence, she provided hints to players who contacted her through a post office box. CGW billed her as "controversial", and often published a Scorpia review together with another of the same game by a different reviewer. She became known for harsh criticism of video games she disliked. Scorpia's review of Ultima VIII: Pagan was highlighted by GameSetWatch as one of the harshest video game reviews ever written. Her review of Might and Magic II: Gates to Another World resulted in an angry response from the game's designer, Jon Van Caneghem, who named a monster after Scorpia in his next game. While usually a fan of Infocom, she disliked Infidel so much that she never mentioned it in print, although lambasting the game during an online chat with creator Mike Berlyn.

CGW editor Johnny Wilson described Scorpia as "one of the most refreshing people you could ever meet" and praised her encyclopedic knowledge of games' puzzles. He cited one example where the two clashed, the role-playing game Darklands. Scorpia wrote a negative review that criticized the game's bugs, and Wilson attached an editorial sidebar that gave a more positive view.  Wilson later acknowledged this was a bad idea, saying that Scorpia's fans correctly criticized him for undercutting her review and overlooking the game's flaws. Because the magazine required a reviewer to finish the game before publishing the review, Wilson said Scorpia favored linearity, resulting in unwarranted criticism of some open-ended works; CGW thus sometimes did not assign her such games.

Scorpia was fired after CGW was sold to Ziff Davis in 1999.  She said it was intimated to her that the magazine wanted to go in a different direction. She neither looked for further work in games journalism nor received any offers; she attributed her reputation for tough reviews as one possible reason for the latter. Scorpia started a subscription webzine after this, but it failed when she could not find enough subscribers.  She subsequently started a free website, where she blogged. She stopped updating the site 3 years later in 2009 after saying that she was unable to afford a new computer needed to keep reviewing games. In a 2019 interview with Kotaku she stated that while she still plays video games she has no desire to return to reviewing them as it was "really more work than most people realize", and is officially retired.

Personal life 
Her pseudonym comes from role-playing games and is based on her astrological sign of Scorpio.  She said she was already known as Scorpia because of her work in online communities and found it "more fitting" than her real name for her focus on role-playing games and adventure games.  She values her privacy and cited that as another reason for using a pseudonym.  At CGW, only owner Sipe knew her real name.  Her favorite video game is Ultima IV: Quest of the Avatar.

References

External links 
  (archived)

20th-century births
Living people
Video game critics
Women video game critics
American women bloggers
American bloggers
Pseudonymous women writers
Year of birth missing (living people)
Place of birth missing (living people)
21st-century American women
21st-century pseudonymous writers